Giambattista Altieri or Giovanni Battista Altieri (20 June 1589 – 26 November 1654) was an Italian Catholic Cardinal.

Early life

Giambattista Altieri was born 20 June 1589 in Rome, the son of Lorenzo Altieri and Victoria Delphini, a Venetian lady. The Altieri family belonged to the ancient Roman nobility and had enjoyed the highest consideration at Rome for several centuries; they had occasionally contracted alliances with the Colonnas and the Orsinis. Altieri was the older brother of Emilio Bonaventura Altieri who was elected to the papal throne as Pope Clement X in 1670. He was educated in Rome and received a doctorate in theology and utroque iure.

Ecclesiastic career

He was ordained on 1 December 1613 and became a theologian of the patriarchal Vatican basilica.

In 1624 he was elected Bishop of Camerino and consecrated by Cardinal Scipione Borghese, Cardinal-Priest of San Crisogono, with Raffaele Inviziati, Bishop Emeritus of Cefalonia e Zante, and Vincenzo Landinelli, Bishop Emeritus of Albenga, serving as co-consecrators. He remained bishop of that diocese until he resigned to allow for his brother Emilio to be appointed. He became Custode del Sigillo of the Apostolic Penitentiary and an Apostolic visitor; travelling representative of the Holy See to at least six suburbicarian dioceses. In 1637 he was appointed Vice-Regent of Rome and held the position until 1643.

Altieri was elevated to cardinal by Pope Urban VIII on 13 July 1643 and was installed, the following month, as Cardinal-Priest of Santa Maria sopra Minerva. He also transferred to the Diocese of Todi. When Pope Urban died, Altieri participated in the Papal conclave of 1644 which elected Pope Innocent X.

Death and burial
Altieri died on 26 November 1654 at Narni while travelling to Rome. News of his death reached Rome two days later. He was buried at the Altieri family chapel in the church of Santa Maria sopra Minerva.

Episcopal succession

References

1589 births
1654 deaths
17th-century Italian cardinals
Cardinals created by Pope Urban VIII
Bishops in le Marche